Mernoq Island is an uninhabited island in Avannaata municipality in northwestern Greenland.

History 
With brief intervals of no permanent settlement, Mernoq Island was inhabited between 1891, when the Kuuk settlement was founded, and 1972, when it was abandoned. Kuuk was perched on the southern end of the island, at the Qernertunnguaq cape.

Geography 
Mernoq Island is located in Tasiusaq Bay, in the north-central part of Upernavik Archipelago. It is sandwiched between Qullikorsuit Island in the north − from which it is separated by the Mernup Tunua strait − Paornivik Island in the northeast, and Tuttorqortooq Island in the southwest.

Coastline 
The coastline of the island is generally undeveloped, with two shallow, unnamed bays in the east.

Promontories

References 

Uninhabited islands of Greenland
Tasiusaq Bay
Islands of the Upernavik Archipelago